Paul Robert Reid (born 19 January 1968 in Oldbury, Worcestershire) is a former English professional footballer. As a player his career as a midfielder saw him feature in the Football League for Leicester City, Bradford City, Huddersfield Town, Oldham Athletic, Bury and Swansea City. At Swansea he scored on his debut against Rushden & Diamonds. He then played in the Welsh Premier League for Carmarthen Town and Afan Lido.

Despite playing at senior level for 17 years, the only major success of his career came in 1995 when he helped Huddersfield Town to gain promotion to the Division One via the Division Two play-offs.

He has worked as a match summariser on local radio for former club Huddersfield Town.

After retiring as a player, he had a spell coaching Swansea City's junior teams before becoming coach of Welsh Premier club Port Talbot Town. After Tony Pennock's resignation in 2007 he acted as caretaker manager for two matches, both won, before staying on as coach under new manager Nicky Tucker. He left the club at the end of the 2007–08 season, but returned in December 2008 after yet another change of management.

In May 2012 he joined Afan Lido as a manager.

After a spell at Afan Lido Paul joined the Swansea City academy where he stayed in the ranks until 2019. Paul then joined Forest Green Rovers Academy.

References

External links
 
 

1968 births
Living people
People from Oldbury, West Midlands
English footballers
Association football midfielders
Leicester City F.C. players
Bradford City A.F.C. players
Huddersfield Town A.F.C. players
Oldham Athletic A.F.C. players
Bury F.C. players
Swansea City A.F.C. players
Carmarthen Town A.F.C. players
English Football League players
Cymru Premier players
English football managers
Afan Lido F.C. players
Afan Lido F.C. managers
Cymru Premier managers
Port Talbot Town F.C. managers